The Gift of Love is a 1968 compilation album by Jerry Butler on Sunset Records. The title track had already been issued as a single by The Temptations in October 1958. Having by 1968 racked up a number of charting singles and become known as a solo artist, Sunset reissued this collection of singles from their back catalogue.

Track listing
The Gift Of Love  – Jerry Butler 2:45 - recorded 1958
Teardrops From My Eyes  – Rudolph Toombs 2:30 - originally recorded 1960
Give Me Your Love - Jerry Butler, Richard Brooks  2:35
Butterfly – Jerry Butler 2:30
The Lights Went Out – Brook Benton, Clyde Otis 2:15
September Song – Kurt Weil, Maxwell Anderson 4:25
Don't Take Your Love From Me  – Henry Nemo 2:15
Come Back, My Love – Clyde Otis, Roy Hamilton  2:35
If You Let Me – Whelock Alex Bessom 2:15
I Was Wrong – Jerry Butler 2:40

References

1968 albums